The Diocese of Aquino e Pontecorvo (Latin: Dioecesis Aquinatensis et Pontiscurvi) was a Roman Catholic diocese in Italy, located in the city of Aquino in the province of Frosinone, in the Lazio region. In 1818, it was suppressed to the Diocese of Sora-Cassino-Aquino-Pontecorvo.

History
450: Established as Diocese of Aquino 
1725 June 23: Name changed to Diocese of Aquino e Pontecorvo (Aquinatensis et Pontiscurvi)
27 June 1818: United with Diocese of Sora to form Diocese of Aquino, Sora, e Pontecorvo

Ordinaries

Diocese of Aquino
Latin Name: Aquinatensis
Erected: 5th Century

Diocese of Aquino e Pontecorvo
Name Changed: 23 June 1725

Francesco Antonio Spadea (22 Jan 1742 – 14 Apr 1751 Resigned) 
Giacinto Sardi (5 Jul 1751 – 25 Sep 1786 Died) 
Antonio Siciliani, C.R.L. (27 Feb 1792 Confirmed – 16 Feb 1795 Died) 
Giuseppe Maria de Mellis (29 Jan 1798 Confirmed – 1814 Died)

See also
Catholic Church in Italy

References

Former Roman Catholic dioceses in Italy